Sarah Chadwick (born August 1, 2001) is an American activist against gun violence and one of the leaders of the Never Again MSD activist movement.

Marjory Stoneman Douglas High School shooting
On the day of the shooting, she described how she saw dozens of police cars arriving at the scene, while some of her friends were texting her from classrooms near the gunshots. In a televised interview, she stated that "never again should a child be afraid to go to school."

Activism
A report in The Washington Post described her and fellow student Jaclyn Corin as "fierce" and particularly skilled at social media, effectively generating "8.7 times to volume of online conversations than the celebrities," according to a marketing analysis of the tweets of the Parkland students. She had a Twitter following of 150,000 people as of February 24, 2018. She has used satire and sarcasm to advance her agenda against gun violence. She is opposed to the National Rifle Association as well as politicians who get funding from the NRA. According to a report in The New York Times, Chadwick has been particularly effective in tweets to mock pro-gun politicians such as Marco Rubio:

When President Trump offered condolences, she shot back with a tweet that went viral with 4,300 comments before it was removed:

When NRA spokesperson Dana Loesch posted a video saying that "your time is up", Chadwick posted a video response, using the hourglass meme:

Personal life
Chadwick identifies as a lesbian, telling Teen Vogue sister magazine Them, "I'm gay, so I'm a lesbian." The Huffington Post described Chadwick and fellow Never Again MSD co-founder X González as "part of the LGBTQ family". She is also pro-choice. She is studying political science and citizenship at Syracuse University.

See also
 2018 United States gun violence protests
 Never Again MSD

References

External links
 Video response to Dana Loesch

2001 births
Living people
American shooting survivors
Crime witnesses
American child activists
American founders
American gun control activists
LGBT people from Florida
People from Parkland, Florida
Stoneman Douglas High School shooting activists
American abortion-rights activists
People from Margate, Florida
21st-century American women
American lesbians
Gun politics in the United States